The 2013–14 Tunisian Ligue Professionnelle 2 (Tunisian Professional League) season was the 59th season since Tunisia's independence.

Teams
The league was contested by 20 teams split into two groups of 10 teams each.

Results

Group A

Group B

Playoffs

Promotion playoffs

Relegation playoff

Relegated teams
 ES Beni-Khalled
 Club Olympique des Transports
 CS Hilalien

See also
2013–14 Tunisian Ligue Professionnelle 1
2013–14 Tunisian Cup

References

External links
 2013–14 Ligue 2 on RSSSF.com

Tun
2013–14 in Tunisian football
Tunisian Ligue Professionnelle 2 seasons